Male member may refer to:
A member of a group or organization who is male
A euphemism for penis